Clark Spur is a narrow, rocky spur about  long, extending from the foothills of the Prince Olav Mountains to the edge of the Ross Ice Shelf. It was discovered and photographed by the Byrd Antarctic Expedition (1928–30) and named for Arnold H. Clark, assistant physicist who wintered with the expedition.

References 

Ridges of Antarctica
Dufek Coast